High Shoals Creek Falls located on High Shoals Creek in the High Shoals Scenic Area of the Chattahoochee National Forest in Towns County, Georgia and features two observation decks.

Waterfalls of Georgia (U.S. state)
Landforms of Towns County, Georgia